The 2019–20 Coupe de France was the 103rd season of the main football cup competition of France. The competition was organised by the French Football Federation (FFF) and was open to all clubs in French football, as well as clubs from the overseas departments and territories (Guadeloupe, French Guiana, Martinique, Mayotte, New Caledonia (Winner of 2019 New Caledonia Cup), Tahiti (Winner of 2018–19 Tahiti Cup), Réunion, Saint Martin, and Saint Pierre and Miquelon).

Rennes were the defending champions, but they were eliminated by Saint-Étienne in the semi-finals.

Due to the COVID-19 pandemic in France, on 28 April 2020, Prime Minister Edouard Philippe announced all sporting events in France, including those behind closed doors, would be banned until September. The FFF were considering whether the final of the Coupe de France could be rescheduled for when events are allowed to restart. On 26 June, the FFF announced that the final was rescheduled to 24 July.

Paris Saint-Germain won their record 13th title overall with a 1–0 win over Saint-Étienne in the final.

Dates

Dates for the first two qualifying round were set by the individual Regional leagues. The remaining qualifying rounds, the seventh and eight round, and the round of 64 took place at weekends. The later rounds up to, but not including, the final, took place on midweek evenings. The final took place on Friday 24 July 2020.

Notable rule changes
For this season, there were changes in the rules of participation for Overseas Territories teams in both the seventh and eighth rounds. For Guadeloupe, French Guiana and Martinique, the seventh round match was defined as being between the two teams who qualified from the sixth round, rather than being a draw against a side from mainland France as previously.

Following the established rule regarding alternation of venue between overseas and mainland, the eighth-round games involving the teams from French Guiana and Martinique were played on mainland France regardless of the order the teams were drawn. However, if the overseas team was drawn first, the match took place at a neutral venue within 100 km of Paris. The eighth-round game involving the team from Guadeloupe took place in Guadeloupe.

Teams

Round 1 to 6

The first six rounds, and any preliminaries required, were organised by the Regional Leagues and the Overseas Territories, who allowed teams from within their league structure to enter at any point up to the third round. Teams from Championnat National 3 entered at the third round, those from Championnat National 2 entered at the fourth round and those from Championnat National entered at the fifth round.

The number of teams entering at each qualifying round was as follows:

Round 7
145 qualifiers from the Regional Leagues were joined by the 11 qualifiers from the Overseas Territories and the 20 teams from Ligue 2.

Ligue 2

 Ajaccio
 Auxerre
 Caen
 Chambly
 Châteauroux
 Clermont
 Grenoble
 Guingamp
 Le Havre
 Le Mans

 Lens
 Lorient
 Nancy
 Niort
 Orléans
 Paris FC
 Rodez
 Sochaux
 Troyes
 Valenciennes

Regional Leagues
Figures in parenthesis indicate the tier of the French football league system the team play at.

Nouvelle-Aquitaine: 12 teams
 Pau FC (3)
 Angoulême-Soyaux Charente (4)
 Bergerac Périgord FC (4)
 Trélissac FC (4)
 Aviron Bayonnais FC (5)
 Stade Montois (5)
 Stade Poitevin FC (5)
 FC Chauray (6)
 FC Nueillaubiers (6)
 OL Saint-Liguaire Niort (6)
 FC Saint-Médard-en-Jalles (6)
 JS Sireuil (7)

Pays de la Loire: 11 teams
 Stade Lavallois (3)
 Les Herbiers VF (4)
 FC Challans (5)
 Voltigeurs de Châteaubriant (5)
 Vendée Fontenay Foot (5)
 La Flèche RC (5)
 Sablé FC (5)
 Ancienne Château-Gontier (6)
 Vendée Poiré-sur-Vie Football (6)
 US La Baule-Le Pouliguen (7)
 ASI Mûrs-Erigné (7)

Centre-Val de Loire: 5 teams
 Bourges Foot (4)
 C'Chartres Football (4)
 Saint-Pryvé Saint-Hilaire FC (4)
 AS Montlouis-sur-Loire (5)
 Tours FC (5)

Corsica: 2 teams
 Gazélec Ajaccio (3)
 FC Bastia-Borgo (3)

Bourgogne-Franche-Comté: 8 teams
 ASM Belfort (4)
 Jura Sud Foot (4)
 Racing Besançon (5)
 FC Montceau Bourgogne (5)
 FC 4 Rivières 70 (6)
 AS Belfort Sud (6)
 RC Lons-le-Saunier (6)
 US La Charité (6)

Grand Est: 19 teams
 SAS Épinal (4)
 FC Mulhouse (4)
 CSO Amnéville (5)
 AS Prix-lès-Mézières (5)
 US Raon-l'Étape (5)
 US Sarre-Union (5)
 ASPV Strasbourg (5)
 ES Thaon (5)
 CA Boulay (6)
 MJEP Cormontreuil (6)
 AS Erstein (6)
 US Forbach (6)
 FC Geispolsheim 01 (6)
 FC Lunéville (6)
 EF Reims Ste Anne Châtillons (6)
 US Vandœuvre (6)
 AS Sundhoffen (7)
 SSEP Hombourg-Haut (8)
 US Oberschaeffolsheim (8)

Méditerranée: 5 teams
 Étoile Fréjus Saint-Raphaël (4)
 RC Grasse (4)
 US Marseille Endoume (4)
 EUGA Ardziv (5)
 Athlético Marseille (5)

Occitanie: 10 teams
 US Colomiers Football (4)
 RCO Agde (5)
 Olympique Alès (5)
 Auch Football (5)
 AS Fabrègues (5)
 Toulouse Rodéo FC (5)
 FC Alberes Argelès (6)
 AS Lattoise (6)
 FC Marssac-Rivières-Senouillac Rives du Tarn (6)
 L'Union Saint-Jean FC (6)

Hauts-de-France: 21 teams
 US Boulogne (3)
 USL Dunkerque (3)
 Iris Club de Croix (4)
 Olympique Saint-Quentin (4)
 Olympique Grande-Synthe (5)
 Stade Portelois (5)
 Le Touquet AC (5)
 Olympique Marcquois Football (5)
 AC Cambrai (6)
 US Gravelines (6)
 US Nœux-les-Mines (6)
 US Saint-Omer (6)
 USM Senlisienne (6)
 US Tourcoing FC (6)
 Wasquehal Football (6)
 Grand Calais Pascal FC (7)
 Olympique Lumbrois (7)
 US Pont Sainte-Maxence (7)
 US Saint-Maximin (7)
 Verton FC (9)
 AS Beauvais Oise (5)

Normandy: 8 teams
 US Quevilly-Rouen (3)
 US Granville (4)
 FC Rouen (4)
 AG Caennaise (5)
 FC Dieppe (5)
 Évreux FC 27 (5)
 ESM Gonfreville (5)
 AF Virois (5)

Brittany: 14 teams
 US Concarneau (3)
 Stade Briochin (4)
 Dinan-Léhon FC (5)
 FC Guichen (5)
 Stade Plabennécois (5)
 Stade Pontivyen (5)
 TA Rennes (5)
 SC Le Rheu (6)
 CEP Lorient (6)
 US Montagnarde (6)
 Saint-Pierre Milizac (6)
 Stade Paimpolais FC (7)
 Avenir Theix (7)
 CS Betton (8)

Paris-Île-de-France: 11 teams
 US Créteil-Lusitanos (3)
 Red Star (3)
 L'Entente SSG (4)
 Sainte-Geneviève Sports (4)
 FC Versailles 78 (5)
 ESA Linas-Montlhéry (6)
 CS Meaux (6)
 Olympique Adamois (7)
 CSM Gennevilliers (7)
 ES Nanterre (7)
 Villemomble Sports (7)

Auvergne-Rhône-Alpes: 19 teams
 Football Bourg-en-Bresse Péronnas 01 (3)
 Le Puy Foot 43 Auvergne (3)
 FC Villefranche (3)
 Annecy FC (4)
 Moulins Yzeure Foot (4)
 FC Bourgoin-Jallieu (5)
 Hauts Lyonnais (5)
 FC Limonest Saint-Didier (5)
 US Saint-Flour (5)
 Chassieu Décines FC (6)
 Thonon Évian FC (6)
 Olympique de Valence (6)
 US Annecy-le-Vieux (7)
 ES Chilly (7)
 Côte Chaude Sportif (7)
 FC Cournon-d'Auvergne (7)
 FC Lyon (7)
 US Mozac (8)
 US Saint-Galmier-Chambœuf (8)

Overseas Territories teams

 French Guiana: 2 teams
 AJ Saint-Georges
 CSC Cayenne

 Martinique: 2 teams
 Golden Star
 Club Franciscain

 Guadeloupe: 2 teams
 AN Jeunesse Évolution
 CS Moulien

 Réunion: 2 teams
 JS Saint-Pierroise
 US Sainte-Marienne

 Mayotte: 1 team
 FC Mtsapéré

 New Caledonia: 1 team
 Hienghène Sport
 Tahiti: 1 team
 A.S. Vénus

Seventh round
The draw for the seventh round took place in two parts, with three sets of ties drawn:
 Playoff ties between teams from the same overseas leagues (Guadeloupe, Martinique, French Guiana) were drawn on 29 October 2019, and took place between 6 and 8 November 2019.
 Ties pitching teams from mainland France against overseas teams (Réunion, New Caledonia, Tahiti) were also drawn on 29 October 2019, and took place on 16 and 17 November 2019.
 Ties involving just teams from mainland France were drawn on 30 October 2019, and took place on 15, 16 and 17 November 2019.

Overseas playoff ties
Ties were played between 6 and 8 November 2019.

Overseas and mainland ties
Ties were played on 16 and 17 November 2019.

Mainland ties
The mainland ties were drawn in ten groups, with two Ligue 2 teams in each group. The rest of the teams in each group were selected to give an even distribution of teams from different tiers, and the best possible geographical fit.

The lowest ranked team remaining in the competition at this stage was Verton FC from tier 9 (District division 1).

Ties were played on 15, 16 and 17 November 2019, with postponements rearranged for 19, 23 and 24 November 2019.

Group 7A

Group 7B

Group 7C

Group 7D

Group 7E

Group 7F

Group 7G

Group 7H

Group 7I

Group 7J

Eighth round
The draw for the eighth round took place in two parts:
 Ties involving overseas teams playing at home (Jeunesse Evolution of Guadeloupe and JS Saint-Pierroise of Réunion) were drawn on 19 November 2019.
 Ties involving teams from mainland France and the remaining teams from Martinique and French Guiana were drawn on 20 November 2019.

All ties took place on the weekend of 7 and 8 December 2019.

Overseas ties
Ties were played on 7 and 8 December 2019.

Main draw ties
The main draw ties were drawn in six groups, with the teams in each group selected to give an even distribution of teams from different tiers, and the best possible geographical fit.

The lowest ranked team remaining in the competition at this stage was SSEP Hombourg-Haut from tier 8 (Regional division 3).

Ties were played on 7 and 8 December 2019.

Group 8A

Group 8B

Group 8C

Group 8D

Group 8E

Group 8F

Round of 64
The draw for the ninth round (known as the round of 64) took place on 9 December 2019. The 20 Ligue 1 teams joined the draw at this stage. The draw was split into four groups to ensure equal distribution of teams from each tier, with geographical proximity a secondary factor.

The lowest ranked team remaining in the competition at this stage was SSEP Hombourg-Haut from tier 8 (Regional League 3).

Games were played on 3, 4, 5 and 6 January 2020.

Group 9A

Group 9B

Group 9C

Group 9D

Round of 32
The draw for the tenth round (known as the round of 32) took place on 6 January 2020. This was an open draw.

The lowest ranked mainland teams remaining in the competition at this stage were AS Prix-lès-Mézières, Athlético Marseille, ESM Gonfreville and FC Limonest Saint-Didier, all from tier 5 (Championnat National 3).

Games were played on 16, 17, 18, 19 and 20 January 2020.

Round of 16
The draw for the eleventh round (known as the round of 16) took place on 19 January 2020. This was an open draw.

The lowest ranked team remaining in the competition at this stage was FC Limonest Saint-Didier from tier 5 (Championnat National 3).

Games were played on 28, 29 and 30 January 2020.

Quarter-finals
The draw for the quarter-finals took place on 30 January 2020. This was an open draw.

The lowest ranked teams remaining in the competition at this stage were ASM Belfort and SAS Épinal, both from tier 4 (Championnat National 2).

Games were played on 11, 12 and 13 February 2020.

Semi-finals
The draw for the semi-finals took place on 13 February 2020. This was an open draw.

Games were played on 4 and 5 March 2020.

Final

The final was originally scheduled for 25 April 2020, but was postponed due to concerns over the COVID-19 pandemic.

Notes

References

External links

Coupe de France 2019–2020 summary 

 
France
Cup
Coupe de France seasons
Coupe de Frane